Kiel Opera House may refer to:

 Stifel Theatre, formerly Kiel Opera House, in St Louis, Missouri, United States 
 Opernhaus Kiel, an opera house in Kiel, Germany